The Horoiata is a right tributary of the river Bârlad in Romania. It discharges into the Bârlad near the village Horoiata. It originates on the Tutova Plateau near Fundu Văii. It crosses the localities of Fundu Văii, Căpușneni, Orgoiești, Vișinari, Vlădești, Ulea, Unțești and Horoiata, before joining the Bârlad near Gara Banca.

References

Rivers of Romania
Rivers of Vaslui County